Palgadh is a village in Dapoli taluka, Ratnagiri district, Maharashtra state, India, between Mandangadh and Khed, best known as the boyhood home of Pandurang Sadashiv Sane.

Villages in Ratnagiri district